The Easter Rising, also known as the Easter Rebellion, was an armed insurrection in Ireland during Easter Week in April 1916. The Rising was launched by Irish republicans against British rule in Ireland with the aim of establishing an independent Irish Republic while the United Kingdom was fighting the First World War. It was the most significant uprising in Ireland since the rebellion of 1798 and the first armed conflict of the Irish revolutionary period. Sixteen of the Rising's leaders were executed from May 1916. The nature of the executions, and subsequent political developments, ultimately contributed to an increase in popular support for Irish independence.

Organised by a seven-man Military Council of the Irish Republican Brotherhood, the Rising began on Easter Monday, 24 April 1916 and lasted for six days. Members of the Irish Volunteers, led by schoolmaster and Irish language activist Patrick Pearse, joined by the smaller Irish Citizen Army of James Connolly and 200 women of Cumann na mBan, seized strategically important buildings in Dublin and proclaimed the Irish Republic. The British Army brought in thousands of reinforcements as well as artillery and a gunboat. There was street fighting on the routes into the city centre, where the rebels slowed the British advance and inflicted many casualties. Elsewhere in Dublin, the fighting mainly consisted of sniping and long-range gun battles. The main rebel positions were gradually surrounded and bombarded with artillery. There were isolated actions in other parts of Ireland; Volunteer leader Eoin MacNeill had issued a countermand in a bid to halt the Rising, which greatly reduced the number of rebels who mobilised.

With much greater numbers and heavier weapons, the British Army suppressed the Rising. Pearse agreed to an unconditional surrender on Saturday 29 April, although sporadic fighting continued briefly. After the surrender, the country remained under martial law. About 3,500 people were taken prisoner by the British and 1,800 of them were sent to internment camps or prisons in Britain. Most of the leaders of the Rising were executed following courts-martial. The Rising brought physical force republicanism back to the forefront of Irish politics, which for nearly fifty years had been dominated by constitutional nationalism. Opposition to the British reaction to the Rising contributed to changes in public opinion and the move toward independence, as shown in the December 1918 election in Ireland which was won by the Sinn Féin party, which convened the First Dáil and declared independence.

Of the 485 people killed, 260 were civilians, 143 were British military and police personnel, and 82 were Irish rebels, including 16 rebels executed for their roles in the Rising. More than 2,600 people were wounded. Many of the civilians were killed or wounded by British artillery fire or were mistaken for rebels. Others were caught in the crossfire during firefights between the British and the rebels. The shelling and resulting fires left parts of central Dublin in ruins.

Background 

The Acts of Union 1800 united the Kingdom of Great Britain and the Kingdom of Ireland as the United Kingdom of Great Britain and Ireland, abolishing the Irish Parliament and giving Ireland representation in the British Parliament. From early on, many Irish nationalists opposed the union and the continued lack of adequate political representation, along with the British government's handling of Ireland and Irish people, particularly the Great Irish Famine. Opposition took various forms: constitutional (the Repeal Association; the Home Rule League), social (disestablishment of the Church of Ireland; the Land League) and revolutionary (Rebellion of 1848; Fenian Rising). The Irish Home Rule movement sought to achieve self-government for Ireland, within the United Kingdom. In 1886, the Irish Parliamentary Party under Charles Stewart Parnell succeeded in having the First Home Rule Bill introduced in the British parliament, but it was defeated. The Second Home Rule Bill of 1893 was passed by the House of Commons but rejected by the House of Lords.

After the death of Parnell, younger and more radical nationalists became disillusioned with parliamentary politics and turned toward more extreme forms of separatism. The Gaelic Athletic Association, the Gaelic League and the cultural revival under W. B. Yeats and Augusta, Lady Gregory, together with the new political thinking of Arthur Griffith expressed in his newspaper Sinn Féin and organisations such as the National Council and the Sinn Féin League, led many Irish people to identify with the idea of an independent Gaelic Ireland. This was sometimes referred to by the generic term Sinn Féin, with the British authorities using it as a collective noun for republicans and advanced nationalists.

The Third Home Rule Bill was introduced by British Liberal Prime Minister H. H. Asquith in 1912. Irish Unionists, who were overwhelmingly Protestants, opposed it, as they did not want to be ruled by a Catholic-dominated Irish government. Led by Sir Edward Carson and James Craig, they formed the Ulster Volunteers (UVF) in January 1913. In response, Irish nationalists formed a rival paramilitary group, the Irish Volunteers, in November 1913. The Irish Republican Brotherhood (IRB) was a driving force behind the Irish Volunteers and attempted to control it. Its leader was Eoin MacNeill, who was not an IRB member. The Irish Volunteers' stated goal was "to secure and to maintain the rights and liberties common to all the people of Ireland". It included people with a range of political views, and was open to "all able-bodied Irishmen without distinction of creed, politics or social group". Another militant group, the Irish Citizen Army, was formed by trade unionists as a result of the Dublin Lock-out of that year. British Army officers threatened to resign if they were ordered to take action against the UVF. When the Irish Volunteers smuggled rifles into Dublin, the British Army attempted to stop them and shot into a crowd of civilians. By 1914, Ireland seemed to be on the brink of a civil war. This seemed to be averted in August of that year by the outbreak of the First World War, and Ireland's involvement in it. Nevertheless, on 18 September 1914 the Government of Ireland Act 1914 was enacted and placed on the statute book, but the Suspensory Act was passed at the same time, which deferred Irish Home Rule for one year, with powers for it to be suspended for further periods of six months so long as the war continued. It was widely believed at the time that the war would not last more than a few months. On 14 September 1915 an Order in Council was made under the Suspensory Act to suspend the Government of Ireland Act until 18 March 1916. Another such Order was made on 29 February 1916, suspending the Act for another six months.

Planning the Rising 

The Supreme Council of the IRB met on 5 September 1914, just over a month after the British government had declared war on Germany. At this meeting, they decided to stage an uprising before the war ended and to secure help from Germany. Responsibility for the planning of the rising was given to Tom Clarke and Seán Mac Diarmada. The Irish Volunteers—the smaller of the two forces resulting from the September 1914 split over support for the British war effort—set up a "headquarters staff" that included Patrick Pearse as Director of Military Organisation, Joseph Plunkett as Director of Military Operations and Thomas MacDonagh as Director of Training. Éamonn Ceannt was later added as Director of Communications.

In May 1915, Clarke and Mac Diarmada established a Military Committee or Military Council within the IRB, consisting of Pearse, Plunkett and Ceannt, to draw up plans for a rising. Clarke and Mac Diarmada joined it shortly after. The Military Council was able to promote its own policies and personnel independently of both the Volunteer Executive and the IRB Executive. Although the Volunteer and IRB leaders were not against a rising in principle, they were of the opinion that it was not opportune at that moment. Volunteer Chief-of-Staff Eoin MacNeill supported a rising only if the British government attempted to suppress the Volunteers or introduce conscription in Ireland, and if such a rising had some chance of success. IRB President Denis McCullough and prominent IRB member Bulmer Hobson held similar views. The Military Council kept its plans secret, so as to prevent the British authorities learning of the plans, and to thwart those within the organisation who might try to stop the rising. IRB members held officer rank in the Volunteers throughout the country and took their orders from the Military Council, not from MacNeill.

Shortly after the outbreak of World War I, Roger Casement and Clan na Gael leader John Devoy met the German ambassador to the United States, Johann Heinrich von Bernstorff, to discuss German backing for an uprising. Casement went to Germany and began negotiations with the German government and military. He persuaded the Germans to announce their support for Irish independence in November 1914. Casement also attempted to recruit an Irish Brigade, made up of Irish prisoners of war, which would be armed and sent to Ireland to join the uprising. However, only 56 men volunteered. Plunkett joined Casement in Germany the following year. Together, Plunkett and Casement presented a plan (the 'Ireland Report') in which a German expeditionary force would land on the west coast of Ireland, while a rising in Dublin diverted the British forces so that the Germans, with the help of local Volunteers, could secure the line of the River Shannon, before advancing on the capital. The German military rejected the plan, but agreed to ship arms and ammunition to the Volunteers.

James Connolly—head of the Irish Citizen Army (ICA), a group of armed socialist trade union men and women—was unaware of the IRB's plans, and threatened to start a rebellion on his own if other parties failed to act. If they had done it alone, the IRB and the Volunteers would possibly have come to their aid; however, the IRB leaders met with Connolly in January 1916 and convinced him to join forces with them. They agreed that they would launch a rising together at Easter and made Connolly the sixth member of the Military Council. Thomas MacDonagh would later become the seventh and final member.

The death of the old Fenian leader Jeremiah O'Donovan Rossa in New York in August 1915 was an opportunity to mount a spectacular demonstration. His body was sent to Ireland for burial in Glasnevin Cemetery, with the Volunteers in charge of arrangements. Huge crowds lined the route and gathered at the graveside. Pearse made a dramatic funeral oration, a rallying call to republicans, which ended with the words "Ireland unfree shall never be at peace".

Build-up to Easter Week 

In early April, Pearse issued orders to the Irish Volunteers for three days of "parades and manoeuvres" beginning on Easter Sunday. He had the authority to do this, as the Volunteers' Director of Organisation. The idea was that IRB members within the organisation would know these were orders to begin the rising, while men such as MacNeill and the British authorities would take it at face value.

On 9 April, the German Navy dispatched the SS Libau for County Kerry, disguised as the Norwegian ship Aud. It was loaded with 20,000 rifles, one million rounds of ammunition, and explosives. Casement also left for Ireland aboard the German submarine U-19. He was disappointed with the level of support offered by the Germans and he intended to stop or at least postpone the rising.

On Wednesday 19 April, Alderman Tom Kelly, a Sinn Féin member of Dublin Corporation, read out at a meeting of the corporation a document purportedly leaked from Dublin Castle, detailing plans by the British authorities to shortly arrest leaders of the Irish Volunteers, Sinn Féin and the Gaelic League, and occupy their premises. Although the British authorities said the "Castle Document" was fake, MacNeill ordered the Volunteers to prepare to resist. Unbeknownst to MacNeill, the document had been forged by the Military Council to persuade moderates of the need for their planned uprising. It was an edited version of a real document outlining British plans in the event of conscription. That same day, the Military Council informed senior Volunteer officers that the rising would begin on Easter Sunday. However, it chose not to inform the rank-and-file, or moderates such as MacNeill, until the last minute.

The following day, MacNeill got wind that a rising was about to be launched and threatened to do everything he could to prevent it, short of informing the British. MacNeill was briefly persuaded to go along with some sort of action when Mac Diarmada revealed to him that a German arms shipment was about to land in County Kerry. MacNeill believed that when the British learned of the shipment they would immediately suppress the Volunteers, thus the Volunteers would be justified in taking defensive action, including the planned manoeuvres.

The Aud and the U-19 reached the coast of Kerry on Good Friday, 21 April. This was earlier than the Volunteers expected and so none were there to meet the vessels. The Royal Navy had known about the arms shipment and intercepted the Aud, prompting the captain to scuttle the ship. Furthermore, Casement was captured shortly after he landed at Banna Strand.

When MacNeill learned from Volunteer Patrick Whelan that the arms shipment had been lost, he reverted to his original position. With the support of other leaders of like mind, notably Bulmer Hobson and The O'Rahilly, he issued a countermand to all Volunteers, cancelling all actions for Sunday. This countermanding order was relayed to Volunteer officers and printed in the Sunday morning newspapers. It succeeded only in delaying the rising for a day, although it greatly reduced the number of Volunteers who turned out.

British Naval Intelligence had been aware of the arms shipment, Casement's return, and the Easter date for the rising through radio messages between Germany and its embassy in the United States that were intercepted by the Royal Navy and deciphered in Room 40 of the Admiralty. The information was passed to the Under-Secretary for Ireland, Sir Matthew Nathan, on 17 April, but without revealing its source and Nathan was doubtful about its accuracy. When news reached Dublin of the capture of the Aud and the arrest of Casement, Nathan conferred with the Lord Lieutenant, Lord Wimborne. Nathan proposed to raid Liberty Hall, headquarters of the Citizen Army, and Volunteer properties at Father Matthew Park and at Kimmage, but Wimborne insisted on wholesale arrests of the leaders. It was decided to postpone action until after Easter Monday, and in the meantime, Nathan telegraphed the Chief Secretary, Augustine Birrell, in London seeking his approval. By the time Birrell cabled his reply authorising the action, at noon on Monday 24 April 1916, the Rising had already begun.

On the morning of Easter Sunday, 23 April, the Military Council met at Liberty Hall to discuss what to do in light of MacNeill's countermanding order. They decided that the Rising would go ahead the following day, Easter Monday, and that the Irish Volunteers and Irish Citizen Army would go into action as the 'Army of the Irish Republic'. They elected Pearse as president of the Irish Republic, and also as Commander-in-Chief of the army; Connolly became Commandant of the Dublin Brigade. Messengers were then sent to all units informing them of the new orders.

The Rising in Dublin

Easter Monday  

On the morning of Monday 24 April, about 1,200 members of the Irish Volunteers and Irish Citizen Army mustered at several locations in central Dublin. Among them were members of the all-female Cumann na mBan. Some wore Irish Volunteer and Citizen Army uniforms, while others wore civilian clothes with a yellow Irish Volunteer armband, military hats, and bandoliers. They were armed mostly with rifles (especially 1871 Mausers), but also with shotguns, revolvers, a few Mauser C96 semi-automatic pistols, and grenades. The number of Volunteers who mobilised was much smaller than expected. This was due to MacNeill's countermanding order, and the fact that the new orders had been sent so soon beforehand. However, several hundred Volunteers joined the Rising after it began.

Shortly before midday, the rebels began to seize important sites in central Dublin. The rebels' plan was to hold Dublin city centre. This was a large, oval-shaped area bounded by two canals: the Grand to the south and the Royal to the north, with the River Liffey running through the middle. On the southern and western edges of this district were five British Army barracks. Most of the rebels' positions had been chosen to defend against counter-attacks from these barracks. The rebels took the positions with ease. Civilians were evacuated and policemen were ejected or taken prisoner. Windows and doors were barricaded, food and supplies were secured, and first aid posts were set up. Barricades were erected on the streets to hinder British Army movement.

A joint force of about 400 Volunteers and Citizen Army gathered at Liberty Hall under the command of Commandant James Connolly. This was the headquarters battalion, and it also included Commander-in-Chief Patrick Pearse, as well as Tom Clarke, Seán Mac Diarmada and Joseph Plunkett. They marched to the General Post Office (GPO) on O'Connell Street, Dublin's main thoroughfare, occupied the building and hoisted two republican flags. Pearse stood outside and read the Proclamation of the Irish Republic. Copies of the Proclamation were also pasted on walls and handed out to bystanders by Volunteers and newsboys. The GPO would be the rebels' headquarters for most of the Rising. Volunteers from the GPO also occupied other buildings on the street, including buildings overlooking O'Connell Bridge. They took over a wireless telegraph station and sent out a radio broadcast in Morse code, announcing that an Irish Republic had been declared. This was the first radio broadcast in Ireland.

Elsewhere, some of the headquarters battalion under Michael Mallin occupied St Stephen's Green, where they dug trenches and barricaded the surrounding roads. The 1st battalion, under Edward 'Ned' Daly, occupied the Four Courts and surrounding buildings, while a company under Seán Heuston occupied the Mendicity Institution, across the River Liffey from the Four Courts. The 2nd battalion, under Thomas MacDonagh, occupied Jacob's biscuit factory. The 3rd battalion, under Éamon de Valera, occupied Boland's Mill and surrounding buildings. The 4th battalion, under Éamonn Ceannt, occupied the South Dublin Union and the distillery on Marrowbone Lane. From each of these garrisons, small units of rebels established outposts in the surrounding area.

The rebels also attempted to cut transport and communication links. As well as erecting roadblocks, they took control of various bridges and cut telephone and telegraph wires. Westland Row and Harcourt Street railway stations were occupied, though the latter only briefly. The railway line was cut at Fairview and the line was damaged by bombs at Amiens Street, Broadstone, Kingsbridge and Lansdowne Road.

Around midday, a small team of Volunteers and Fianna Éireann members swiftly captured the Magazine Fort in the Phoenix Park and disarmed the guards. The goal was to seize weapons and blow up the ammunition store to signal that the Rising had begun. They seized weapons and planted explosives, but the blast was not loud enough to be heard across the city. The 23-year-old son of the fort's commander was fatally shot when he ran to raise the alarm.

A contingent under Seán Connolly occupied Dublin City Hall and adjacent buildings. They attempted to seize neighbouring Dublin Castle, the heart of British rule in Ireland. As they approached the gate a lone and unarmed police sentry, James O'Brien, attempted to stop them and was shot dead by Connolly. According to some accounts, he was the first casualty of the Rising. The rebels overpowered the soldiers in the guardroom but failed to press further. The British Army's chief intelligence officer, Major Ivon Price, fired on the rebels while the Under-Secretary for Ireland, Sir Matthew Nathan, helped shut the castle gates. Unbeknownst to the rebels, the Castle was lightly guarded and could have been taken with ease. The rebels instead laid siege to the Castle from City Hall. Fierce fighting erupted there after British reinforcements arrived. The rebels on the roof exchanged fire with soldiers on the street. Seán Connolly was shot dead by a sniper, becoming the first rebel casualty. By the following morning, British forces had re-captured City Hall and taken the rebels prisoner.

The rebels did not attempt to take some other key locations, notably Trinity College, in the heart of the city centre and defended by only a handful of armed unionist students. Failure to capture the telephone exchange in Crown Alley left communications in the hands of Government with GPO staff quickly repairing telephone wires that had been cut by the rebels. The failure to occupy strategic locations was attributed to lack of manpower. In at least two incidents, at Jacob's and Stephen's Green, the Volunteers and Citizen Army shot dead civilians trying to attack them or dismantle their barricades. Elsewhere, they hit civilians with their rifle butts to drive them off.

The British military were caught totally unprepared by the Rising and their response of the first day was generally un-coordinated. Two squadrons  of British cavalry were sent to investigate what was happening. They took fire and casualties from rebel forces at the GPO and at the Four Courts. As one troop passed Nelson's Pillar, the rebels opened fire from the GPO, killing three cavalrymen and two horses and fatally wounding a fourth man. The cavalrymen retreated and were withdrawn to barracks. On Mount Street, a group of Volunteer Training Corps men stumbled upon the rebel position and four were killed before they reached Beggars Bush Barracks.

The only substantial combat of the first day of the Rising took place at the South Dublin Union where a piquet from the Royal Irish Regiment encountered an outpost of Éamonn Ceannt's force at the northwestern corner of the South Dublin Union. The British troops, after taking some casualties, managed to regroup and launch several assaults on the position before they forced their way inside and the small rebel force in the tin huts at the eastern end of the Union surrendered. However, the Union complex as a whole remained in rebel hands. A nurse in uniform, Margaret Keogh, was shot dead by British soldiers at the Union. She is believed to have been the first civilian killed in the Rising.

Three unarmed Dublin Metropolitan Police were shot dead on the first day of the Rising and their Commissioner pulled them off the streets. Partly as a result of the police withdrawal, a wave of looting broke out in the city centre, especially in the area of O'Connell Street (still officially called "Sackville Street" at the time).

Tuesday and Wednesday 
Lord Wimborne, the Lord Lieutenant, declared martial law on Tuesday evening and handed over civil power to Brigadier-General William Lowe. British forces initially put their efforts into securing the approaches to Dublin Castle and isolating the rebel headquarters, which they believed was in Liberty Hall. The British commander, Lowe, worked slowly, unsure of the size of the force he was up against, and with only 1,269 troops in the city when he arrived from the Curragh Camp in the early hours of Tuesday 25 April. City Hall was taken from the rebel unit that had attacked Dublin Castle on Tuesday morning.

In the early hours of Tuesday, 120 British soldiers, with machine-guns, occupied two buildings overlooking St Stephen's Green: the Shelbourne Hotel and United Services Club. At dawn they opened fire on the Citizen Army occupying the green. The rebels returned fire but were forced to retreat to the Royal College of Surgeons building. They remained there for the rest of the week, exchanging fire with British forces.

Fighting erupted along the northern edge of the city centre on Tuesday afternoon. In the northeast, British troops left Amiens Street railway station in an armoured train, to secure and repair a section of damaged tracks. They were attacked by rebels who had taken up position at Annesley Bridge. After a two-hour battle, the British were forced to retreat and several soldiers were captured. At Phibsborough, in the northwest, rebels had occupied buildings and erected barricades at junctions on the North Circular Road. The British summoned 18-pounder field artillery from Athlone and shelled the rebel positions, destroying the barricades. After a fierce firefight, the rebels withdrew.

That afternoon Pearse walked out into O'Connell Street with a small escort and stood in front of Nelson's Pillar. As a large crowd gathered, he read out a 'manifesto to the citizens of Dublin,' calling on them to support the Rising.

The rebels had failed to take either of Dublin's two main railway stations or either of its ports, at Dublin Port and Kingstown. As a result, during the following week, the British were able to bring in thousands of reinforcements from Britain and from their garrisons at the Curragh and Belfast. By the end of the week, British strength stood at over 16,000 men. Their firepower was provided by field artillery which they positioned on the Northside of the city at Phibsborough and at Trinity College, and by the patrol vessel Helga, which sailed up the Liffey, having been summoned from the port at Kingstown. On Wednesday, 26 April, the guns at Trinity College and Helga shelled Liberty Hall, and the Trinity College guns then began firing at rebel positions, first at Boland's Mill and then in O'Connell Street. Some rebel commanders, particularly James Connolly, did not believe that the British would shell the 'second city' of the British Empire.

The principal rebel positions at the GPO, the Four Courts, Jacob's Factory and Boland's Mill saw little action. The British surrounded and bombarded them rather than assault them directly. One Volunteer in the GPO recalled, "we did practically no shooting as there was no target". However, where the rebels dominated the routes by which the British tried to funnel reinforcements into the city, there was fierce fighting.

At 5:25PM Volunteers Eamon Martin, Garry Holohan, Robert Beggs, Sean Cody, Dinny O'Callaghan, Charles Shelley, Peadar Breslin and five others attempted to occupy Broadstone railway station on Church Street, the attack was unsuccessful and Martin was injured.

On Wednesday morning, hundreds of British troops encircled the Mendicity Institution, which was occupied by 26 Volunteers under Seán Heuston. British troops advanced on the building, supported by snipers and machine-gun fire, but the Volunteers put up stiff resistance. Eventually, the troops got close enough to hurl grenades into the building, some of which the rebels threw back. Exhausted and almost out of ammunition, Heuston's men became the first rebel position to surrender. Heuston had been ordered to hold his position for a few hours, to delay the British, but had held on for three days.

Reinforcements were sent to Dublin from Britain and disembarked at Kingstown on the morning of Wednesday 26 April. Heavy fighting occurred at the rebel-held positions around the Grand Canal as these troops advanced towards Dublin. More than 1,000 Sherwood Foresters were repeatedly caught in a cross-fire trying to cross the canal at Mount Street Bridge. Seventeen Volunteers were able to severely disrupt the British advance, killing or wounding 240 men. Despite there being alternative routes across the canal nearby, General Lowe ordered repeated frontal assaults on the Mount Street position. The British eventually took the position, which had not been reinforced by the nearby rebel garrison at Boland's Mills, on Thursday, but the fighting there inflicted up to two-thirds of their casualties for the entire week for a cost of just four dead Volunteers. It had taken nearly nine hours for the British to advance .

On Wednesday Linenhall Barracks on Constitution Hill was burnt down under the orders of Commandant Edward Daly to prevent its reoccupation by the British.

Thursday to Saturday 
The rebel position at the South Dublin Union (site of the present-day St. James's Hospital) and Marrowbone Lane, further west along the canal, also inflicted heavy losses on British troops. The South Dublin Union was a large complex of buildings and there was vicious fighting around and inside the buildings. Cathal Brugha, a rebel officer, distinguished himself in this action and was badly wounded. By the end of the week, the British had taken some of the buildings in the Union, but others remained in rebel hands. British troops also took casualties in unsuccessful frontal assaults on the Marrowbone Lane Distillery.

The third major scene of fighting during the week was in the area of North King Street, north of the Four Courts. The rebels had established strong outposts in the area, occupying numerous small buildings and barricading the streets. From Thursday to Saturday, the British made repeated attempts to capture the area, in what was some of the fiercest fighting of the Rising. As the troops moved in, the rebels continually opened fire from windows and behind chimneys and barricades. At one point, a platoon led by Major Sheppard made a bayonet charge on one of the barricades but was cut down by rebel fire. The British employed machine guns and attempted to avoid direct fire by using makeshift armoured trucks, and by mouse-holing through the inside walls of terraced houses to get near the rebel positions. By the time of the rebel headquarters' surrender on Saturday, the South Staffordshire Regiment under Colonel Taylor had advanced only  down the street at a cost of 11 dead and 28 wounded. The enraged troops broke into the houses along the street and shot or bayoneted fifteen unarmed male civilians whom they accused of being rebel fighters.

Elsewhere, at Portobello Barracks, an officer named Bowen Colthurst summarily executed six civilians, including the pacifist nationalist activist, Francis Sheehy-Skeffington. These instances of British troops killing Irish civilians would later be highly controversial in Ireland.

Surrender 

The headquarters garrison at the GPO was forced to evacuate after days of shelling when a fire caused by the shells spread to the GPO. Connolly had been incapacitated by a bullet wound to the ankle and had passed command on to Pearse. The O'Rahilly was killed in a sortie from the GPO. They tunnelled through the walls of the neighbouring buildings in order to evacuate the Post Office without coming under fire and took up a new position in 16 Moore Street. The young Seán McLoughlin was given military command and planned a breakout, but Pearse realised this plan would lead to further loss of civilian life.

On Saturday 29 April, from this new headquarters, Pearse issued an order for all companies to surrender. Pearse surrendered unconditionally to Brigadier-General Lowe. The surrender document read:

The other posts surrendered only after Pearse's surrender order, carried by nurse Elizabeth O'Farrell, reached them. Sporadic fighting, therefore, continued until Sunday, when word of the surrender was got to the other rebel garrisons. Command of British forces had passed from Lowe to General John Maxwell, who arrived in Dublin just in time to take the surrender. Maxwell was made temporary military governor of Ireland.

The Rising outside Dublin 

Irish Volunteer units mobilised on Easter Sunday in several places outside of Dublin, but because of Eoin MacNeill's countermanding order, most of them returned home without fighting. In addition, because of the interception of the German arms aboard the Aud, the provincial Volunteer units were very poorly armed.

In the south, around 1,200 Volunteers commanded by Tomás Mac Curtain mustered on the Sunday in Cork, but they dispersed on Wednesday after receiving nine contradictory orders by dispatch from the Volunteer leadership in Dublin. At their Sheares Street headquarters, some of the Volunteers engaged in a standoff with British forces. Much to the anger of many Volunteers, MacCurtain, under pressure from Catholic clergy, agreed to surrender his men's arms to the British. The only violence in Cork occurred when the RIC attempted to raid the home of the Kent family. The Kent brothers, who were Volunteers, engaged in a three-hour firefight with the RIC. An RIC officer and one of the brothers were killed, while another brother was later executed.

In the north, Volunteer companies were mobilised in County Tyrone at Coalisland (including 132 men from Belfast led by IRB President Dennis McCullough) and Carrickmore, under the leadership of Patrick McCartan. They also mobilised at Creeslough, County Donegal under Daniel Kelly and James McNulty. However, in part because of the confusion caused by the countermanding order, the Volunteers in these locations dispersed without fighting.

Fingal 
In Fingal (north County Dublin), about 60 Volunteers mobilised near Swords. They belonged to the 5th Battalion of the Dublin Brigade (also known as the Fingal Battalion), and were led by Thomas Ashe and his second in command, Richard Mulcahy. Unlike the rebels elsewhere, the Fingal Battalion successfully employed guerrilla tactics. They set up camp and Ashe split the battalion into four sections: three would undertake operations while the fourth was kept in reserve, guarding camp and foraging for food. The Volunteers moved against the RIC barracks in Swords, Donabate and Garristown, forcing the RIC to surrender and seizing all the weapons. They also damaged railway lines and cut telegraph wires. The railway line at Blanchardstown was bombed to prevent a troop train reaching Dublin. This derailed a cattle train, which had been sent ahead of the troop train.

The only large-scale engagement of the Rising, outside Dublin city, was at Ashbourne, County Meath. On Friday, about 35 Fingal Volunteers surrounded the Ashbourne RIC barracks and called on it to surrender, but the RIC responded with a volley of gunfire. A firefight followed, and the RIC surrendered after the Volunteers attacked the building with a homemade grenade. Before the surrender could be taken, up to sixty RIC men arrived in a convoy, sparking a five-hour gun battle, in which eight RIC men were killed and 18 wounded. Two Volunteers were also killed and five wounded, and a civilian was fatally shot. The RIC surrendered and were disarmed. Ashe let them go after warning them not to fight against the Irish Republic again. Ashe's men camped at Kilsalaghan near Dublin until they received orders to surrender on Saturday. The Fingal Battalion's tactics during the Rising foreshadowed those of the IRA during the War of Independence that followed.

Volunteer contingents also mobilised nearby in counties Meath and Louth but proved unable to link up with the North Dublin unit until after it had surrendered. In County Louth, Volunteers shot dead an RIC man near the village of Castlebellingham on 24 April, in an incident in which 15 RIC men were also taken prisoner.

Enniscorthy 

In County Wexford, 100–200 Volunteers—led by Robert Brennan, Séamus Doyle and Seán Etchingham—took over the town of Enniscorthy on Thursday 27 April until Sunday. Volunteer officer Paul Galligan had cycled 200 km from rebel headquarters in Dublin with orders to mobilise. They blocked all roads into the town and made a brief attack on the RIC barracks, but chose to blockade it rather than attempt to capture it. They flew the tricolour over the Athenaeum building, which they had made their headquarters, and paraded uniformed in the streets. They also occupied Vinegar Hill, where the United Irishmen had made a last stand in the 1798 rebellion. The public largely supported the rebels and many local men offered to join them.

By Saturday, up to 1,000 rebels had been mobilised, and a detachment was sent to occupy the nearby village of Ferns. In Wexford, the British assembled a column of 1,000 soldiers (including the Connaught Rangers), two field guns and a 4.7 inch naval gun on a makeshift armoured train. On Sunday, the British sent messengers to Enniscorthy, informing the rebels of Pearse's surrender order. However, the Volunteer officers were sceptical. Two of them were escorted by the British to Arbour Hill Prison, where Pearse confirmed the surrender order.

Galway 
In County Galway, 600–700 Volunteers mobilised on Tuesday under Liam Mellows. His plan was to "bottle up the British garrison and divert the British from concentrating on Dublin". However, his men were poorly armed, with only 25 rifles, 60 revolvers, 300 shotguns and some homemade grenades – many of them only had pikes. Most of the action took place in a rural area to the east of Galway city. They made unsuccessful attacks on the RIC barracks at Clarinbridge and Oranmore, captured several officers, and bombed a bridge and railway line, before taking up position near Athenry. There was also a skirmish between rebels and an RIC mobile patrol at Carnmore crossroads. A constable, Patrick Whelan, was shot dead after he had called to the rebels: "Surrender, boys, I know ye all".

On Wednesday,  arrived in Galway Bay and shelled the countryside on the northeastern edge of Galway. The rebels retreated southeast to Moyode, an abandoned country house and estate. From here they set up lookout posts and sent out scouting parties. On Friday,  landed 200 Royal Marines and began shelling the countryside near the rebel position. The rebels retreated further south to Limepark, another abandoned country house. Deeming the situation to be hopeless, they dispersed on Saturday morning. Many went home and were arrested following the Rising, while others, including Mellows, went "on the run". By the time British reinforcements arrived in the west, the Rising there had already disintegrated.

Limerick and Clare 
In County Limerick, 300 Irish Volunteers assembled at Glenquin Castle near Killeedy, but they did not take any military action.

In County Clare, Micheal Brennan marched with 100 Volunteers (from Meelick, Oatfield, and Cratloe) to the River Shannon on Easter Monday to await orders from the Rising leaders in Dublin, and weapons from the expected Casement shipment. However, neither arrived and no actions were taken.

Casualties 

The Easter Rising resulted in at least 485 deaths, according to the Glasnevin Trust.
Of those killed:
 260 (about 54%) were civilians
 126 (about 26%) were U.K. forces (120 U.K. military personnel, 5 Volunteer Training Corps members, and one Canadian soldier)
 35 – Irish Regiments:-
 11 – Royal Dublin Fusiliers
 10 – Royal Irish Rifles
 9 – Royal Irish Regiment
 2 – Royal Inniskilling Fusiliers
 2 – Royal Irish Fusiliers
 1 – Leinster Regiment
 74 – British Regiments:-
 29 – Sherwood Foresters
 15 – South Staffordshire
 2 – North Staffordshire
 1 – Royal Field Artillery
 4 – Royal Engineers
 5 – Army Service Corps
 10 – Lancers
 7 – 8th Hussars
 2 – 2nd King Edwards Horse
 3 – Yeomanry
 1 – Royal Navy
 82 (about 16%) were Irish rebel forces (64 Irish Volunteers, 15 Irish Citizen Army and 3 Fianna Éireann)
 17 (about 4%) were police
 14 – Royal Irish Constabulary
 3 – Dublin Metropolitan Police

More than 2,600 were wounded; including at least 2,200 civilians and rebels, at least 370 British soldiers and 29 policemen. All 16 police fatalities and 22 of the British soldiers killed were Irishmen. About 40 of those killed were children (under 17 years old), four of whom were members of the rebel forces.

The number of casualties each day steadily rose, with 55 killed on Monday and 78 killed on Saturday. The British Army suffered their biggest losses in the Battle of Mount Street Bridge on Wednesday, when at least 30 soldiers were killed. The rebels also suffered their biggest losses on that day. The RIC suffered most of their casualties in the Battle of Ashbourne on Friday.

The majority of the casualties, both killed and wounded, were civilians. Most of the civilian casualties and most of the casualties overall were caused by the British Army. This was due to the British using artillery, incendiary shells and heavy machine guns in built-up areas, as well as their "inability to discern rebels from civilians". One Royal Irish Regiment officer recalled, "they regarded, not unreasonably, everyone they saw as an enemy, and fired at anything that moved". Many other civilians were killed when caught in the crossfire. Both sides, British and rebel, also shot civilians deliberately on occasion; for not obeying orders (such as to stop at checkpoints), for assaulting or attempting to hinder them, and for looting. There were also instances of British troops killing unarmed civilians out of revenge or frustration: notably in the North King Street Massacre, where fifteen were killed, and at Portobello Barracks, where six were shot. Furthermore, there were incidents of friendly fire. On 29 April, the Royal Dublin Fusiliers under Company Quartermaster Sergeant Robert Flood shot dead two British officers and two Irish civilian employees of the Guinness Brewery after he decided they were rebels. Flood was court-martialled for murder but acquitted.

According to the historian Fearghal McGarry, the rebels attempted to avoid needless bloodshed. Desmond Ryan stated that Volunteers were told "no firing was to take place except under orders or to repel attack". Aside from the engagement at Ashbourne, policemen and unarmed soldiers were not systematically targeted, and a large group of policemen was allowed to stand at Nelson's Pillar throughout Monday. McGarry writes that the Irish Citizen Army "were more ruthless than Volunteers when it came to shooting policemen" and attributes this to the "acrimonious legacy" of the Dublin Lock-out.

The vast majority of the Irish casualties were buried in Glasnevin Cemetery in the aftermath of the fighting. British families came to Dublin Castle in May 1916 to reclaim the bodies of British soldiers, and funerals were arranged. Soldiers whose bodies were not claimed were given military funerals in Grangegorman Military Cemetery.

Aftermath

Arrests and executions 
General Maxwell quickly signalled his intention "to arrest all dangerous Sinn Feiners", including "those who have taken an active part in the movement although not in the present rebellion", reflecting the popular belief that Sinn Féin, a separatist organisation that was neither militant nor republican, was behind the Rising.

A total of 3,430 men and 79 women were arrested, including 425 people for looting. A series of courts-martial began on 2 May, in which 187 people were tried, most of them at Richmond Barracks. The president of the courts-martial was Charles Blackader. Controversially, Maxwell decided that the courts-martial would be held in secret and without a defence, which Crown law officers later ruled to have been illegal. Some of those who conducted the trials had commanded British troops involved in suppressing the Rising, a conflict of interest that the Military Manual prohibited. Only one of those tried by courts-martial was a woman, Constance Markievicz, who was also the only woman to be kept in solitary confinement. Ninety were sentenced to death. Fifteen of those (including all seven signatories of the Proclamation) had their sentences confirmed by Maxwell and fourteen were executed by firing squad at Kilmainham Gaol between 3 and 12 May. Among them was the seriously wounded Connolly, who was shot while tied to a chair because of his shattered ankle. Maxwell stated that only the "ringleaders" and those proven to have committed "coldblooded murder" would be executed. However, the evidence presented was weak, and some of those executed were not leaders and did not kill anyone: Willie Pearse described himself as "a personal attaché to my brother, Patrick Pearse"; John MacBride had not even been aware of the Rising until it began, but had fought against the British in the Boer War fifteen years before; Thomas Kent did not come out at all—he was executed for the killing of a police officer during the raid on his house the week after the Rising. The most prominent leader to escape execution was Éamon de Valera, Commandant of the 3rd Battalion, who did so partly because of his American birth.

Most of the executions took place over a ten-day period:
 3 May: Patrick Pearse, Thomas MacDonagh and Thomas Clarke
 4 May: Joseph Plunkett, William Pearse, Edward Daly and Michael O'Hanrahan
 5 May: John MacBride
 8 May: Éamonn Ceannt, Michael Mallin, Seán Heuston and Con Colbert
 12 May: James Connolly and Seán Mac Diarmada

As the executions went on, the Irish public grew increasingly hostile towards the British and sympathetic to the rebels. After the first three executions, John Redmond, leader of the moderate Irish Parliamentary Party, said in the British Parliament that the rising "happily, seems to be over. It has been dealt with with firmness, which was not only right, but it was the duty of the Government to so deal with it". However, he urged the Government "not to show undue hardship or severity to the great masses of those who are implicated". As the executions continued, Redmond pleaded with Asquith to stop them, warning that "if more executions take place in Ireland, the position will become impossible for any constitutional party". Ulster Unionist Party leader Edward Carson expressed similar views. Redmond's deputy, John Dillon, made an impassioned speech in parliament, saying "thousands of people […] who ten days ago were bitterly opposed to the whole of the Sinn Fein movement and to the rebellion, are now becoming infuriated against the Government on account of these executions". He said "it is not murderers who are being executed; it is insurgents who have fought a clean fight, a brave fight, however misguided". Dillon was heckled by English MPs. The British Government itself had also become concerned at the reaction to the executions, and at the way the courts-martial were being carried out. Asquith had warned Maxwell that "a large number of executions would […] sow the seeds of lasting trouble in Ireland". After Connolly's execution, Maxwell bowed to pressure and had the other death sentences commuted to penal servitude.

Frongoch prison camp 

Most of the people arrested were subsequently released, however under Regulation 14B of the Defence of the Realm Act 1914 1,836 men were interned at internment camps and prisons in England and Wales. Many of them, like Arthur Griffith, had little or nothing to do with the Rising. 

Until 1916 the camp housed German prisoners of war in a yellow distillery and crude huts, but in the wake of the 1916 Easter Rising in Dublin, Ireland, the German prisoners were moved and it was used as an internment camp for approximately 1,800 Irish republicans, held without trial. Among them such notables as Michael Collins, who were accorded the status of prisoners of war. Among the prisoners were the future Hollywood actor Arthur Shields and sportsman and referee Tom Burke. Elwyn Edwards, a local councillor, historian and poet suggests that the Irish War of Independence was won in Fongoch in Wales.

Casement was tried in London for high treason and hanged at Pentonville Prison on 3 August.

British atrocities 

After the Rising, reports of atrocities carried out by British troops began to emerge. Although they did not receive as much attention as the executions, they sparked outrage among the Irish public and were raised by Irish MPs in Parliament.

One incident was the 'Portobello killings'. On Tuesday 25 April, Dubliner Francis Sheehy-Skeffington, a pacifist nationalist activist, had been arrested by British soldiers. Captain John Bowen-Colthurst then took him with a British raiding party as a hostage and human shield. On Rathmines Road he stopped a boy named James Coade, whom he shot dead. His troops then destroyed a tobacconist's shop with grenades and seized journalists Thomas Dickson and Patrick MacIntyre. The next morning, Colthurst had Skeffington and the two journalists shot by firing squad in Portobello Barracks. The bodies were then buried there. Later that day he shot a Labour Party councillor, Richard O'Carroll. When Major Sir Francis Vane learned of the killings he telephoned his superiors in Dublin Castle, but no action was taken. Vane informed Herbert Kitchener, who told Maxwell to arrest Colthurst, but Maxwell refused. Colthurst was eventually arrested and court-martialled in June. He was found guilty of murder but insane, and detained for twenty months at Broadmoor. Public and political pressure led to a public inquiry, which reached similar conclusions. Major Vane was discharged "owing to his action in the Skeffington murder case".

The other incident was the 'North King Street Massacre'. On the night of 28–29 April, British soldiers of the South Staffordshire Regiment, under Colonel Henry Taylor, had burst into houses on North King Street and killed fifteen male civilians whom they accused of being rebels. The soldiers shot or bayoneted the victims, then secretly buried some of them in cellars or back yards after robbing them. The area saw some of the fiercest fighting of the Rising and the British had taken heavy casualties for little gain. Maxwell attempted to excuse the killings and argued that the rebels were ultimately responsible. He claimed that "the rebels wore no uniform" and that the people of North King Street were rebel sympathisers. Maxwell concluded that such incidents "are absolutely unavoidable in such a business as this" and that "under the circumstance the troops [...] behaved with the greatest restraint". A private brief, prepared for the Prime Minister, said the soldiers "had orders not to take any prisoners" but took it to mean they were to shoot any suspected rebel. The City Coroner's inquest found that soldiers had killed "unarmed and unoffending" residents. The military court of inquiry ruled that no specific soldiers could be held responsible, and no action was taken.

These killings, and the British response to them, helped sway Irish public opinion against the British.

Inquiry 
A Royal Commission was set up to enquire into the causes of the Rising. It began hearings on 18 May under the chairmanship of Lord Hardinge of Penshurst. The Commission heard evidence from Sir Matthew Nathan, Augustine Birrell, Lord Wimborne, Sir Neville Chamberlain (Inspector-General of the Royal Irish Constabulary), General Lovick Friend, Major Ivor Price of Military Intelligence and others. The report, published on 26 June, was critical of the Dublin administration, saying that "Ireland for several years had been administered on the principle that it was safer and more expedient to leave the law in abeyance if collision with any faction of the Irish people could thereby be avoided." Birrell and Nathan had resigned immediately after the Rising. Wimborne resisted the pressure to resign, but was recalled to London by Asquith. He was re-appointed in July 1916. Chamberlain also resigned.

Reaction of the Dublin public 
At first, many Dubliners were bewildered by the outbreak of the Rising. James Stephens, who was in Dublin during the week, thought, "None of these people were prepared for Insurrection. The thing had been sprung on them so suddenly they were unable to take sides."

There was great hostility towards the Volunteers in some parts of the city. Historian Keith Jeffery noted that most of the opposition came from people whose relatives were in the British Army and who depended on their army allowances. Those most openly hostile to the Volunteers were the "separation women" (so-called because they were paid "separation money" by the British government), whose husbands and sons were fighting in the British Army in the First World War. There was also hostility from unionists. Supporters of the Irish Parliamentary Party also felt the rebellion was a betrayal of their party. When occupying positions in the South Dublin Union and Jacob's factory, the rebels got involved in physical confrontations with civilians who tried to tear down the rebel barricades and prevent them taking over buildings. The Volunteers shot and clubbed a number of civilians who assaulted them or tried to dismantle their barricades.

That the Rising resulted in a great deal of death and destruction, as well as disrupting food supplies, also contributed to the antagonism toward the rebels. After the surrender, the Volunteers were hissed at, pelted with refuse, and denounced as "murderers" and "starvers of the people". Volunteer Robert Holland for example remembered being "subjected to very ugly remarks and cat-calls from the poorer classes" as they marched to surrender. He also reported being abused by people he knew as he was marched through the Kilmainham area into captivity and said the British troops saved them from being manhandled by the crowd.

However, some Dubliners expressed support for the rebels. Canadian journalist and writer Frederick Arthur McKenzie wrote that in poorer areas, "there was a vast amount of sympathy with the rebels, particularly after the rebels were defeated". He wrote of crowds cheering a column of rebel prisoners as it passed, with one woman remarking "Shure, we cheer them. Why shouldn't we? Aren't they our own flesh and blood?". At Boland's Mill, the defeated rebels were met with a large crowd, "many weeping and expressing sympathy and sorrow, all of them friendly and kind". Other onlookers were sympathetic but watched in silence. Christopher M. Kennedy notes that "those who sympathised with the rebels would, out of fear for their own safety, keep their opinions to themselves". Áine Ceannt witnessed British soldiers arresting a woman who cheered the captured rebels. An RIC District Inspector's report stated: "Martial law, of course, prevents any expression of it; but a strong undercurrent of disloyalty exists". Thomas Johnson, the Labour Party leader, thought there was "no sign of sympathy for the rebels, but general admiration for their courage and strategy".

The aftermath of the Rising, and in particular the British reaction to it, helped sway a large section of Irish nationalist opinion away from hostility or ambivalence and towards support for the rebels of Easter 1916. Dublin businessman and Quaker James G. Douglas, for example, hitherto a Home Ruler, wrote that his political outlook changed radically during the course of the Rising because of the British military occupation of the city and that he became convinced that parliamentary methods would not be enough to expel the British from Ireland.

Rise of Sinn Féin 
A meeting called by Count Plunkett on 19 April 1917 led to the formation of a broad political movement under the banner of Sinn Féin which was formalised at the Sinn Féin Ard Fheis of 25 October 1917. The Conscription Crisis of 1918 further intensified public support for Sinn Féin before the general elections to the British Parliament on 14 December 1918, which resulted in a landslide victory for Sinn Féin, winning 73 seats out of 105, whose Members of Parliament (MPs) gathered in Dublin on 21 January 1919 to form Dáil Éireann and adopt the Declaration of Independence.

Legacy 

Shortly after the Easter Rising, poet Francis Ledwidge wrote "O’Connell Street" and "Lament for the Poets of 1916", which both describe his sense of loss and an expression of holding the same "dreams," as the Easter Rising's Irish Republicans. He would also go on to write lament for Thomas MacDonagh for his fallen friend and fellow Irish Volunteer. A few months after the Easter Rising, W. B. Yeats commemorated some of the fallen figures of the Irish Republican movement, as well as his torn emotions regarding these events, in the poem Easter, 1916.

Some of the survivors of the Rising went on to become leaders of the independent Irish state. Those who were executed were venerated by many as martyrs; their graves in Dublin's former military prison of Arbour Hill became a national monument and the Proclamation text was taught in schools. An annual commemorative military parade was held each year on Easter Sunday. In 1935, Éamon de Valera unveiled a statue of the mythical Irish hero Cú Chulainn, sculpted by Oliver Sheppard, at the General Post Office as part of the Rising commemorations that year – it is often seen to be an important symbol of martyrdom in remembrance of the 1916 rebels. Memorials to the heroes of the Rising are to be found in other Irish cities, such as Limerick. The 1916 Medal was issued in 1941 to people with recognised military service during the Rising.

The parades culminated in a huge national celebration on the 50th anniversary of the Rising in 1966. Medals were issued by the government to survivors who took part in the Rising at the event. RTÉ, the Irish national broadcaster, as one of its first major undertakings made a series of commemorative programmes for the 1966 anniversary of the Rising. Roibéárd Ó Faracháin, head of programming said, "While still seeking historical truth, the emphasis will be on homage, on salutation." At the same time, CIÉ, the Republic of Ireland's railway operator, renamed several of its major stations after republicans who played key roles in the Easter Rising.

Ireland's first commemorative coin was also issued in 1966 to pay tribute to the Easter Rising. It was valued at 10 shillings, therefore having the highest denomination of any pre-decimal coin issued by the country. The coin featured a bust of Patrick Pearse on the obverse and an image of the statue of Cú Chulainn in the GPO on the reverse. Its edge inscription reads, "Éirí Amach na Cásca 1916", which translates to, "1916 Easter Rising". Due to their 83.5% silver content, many of the coins were melted down shortly after issue. A €2 coin was also issued by Ireland in 2016, featuring the statue of Hibernia above the GPO, to commemorate the Rising's centenary.

With the outbreak of the Troubles in Northern Ireland, government, academics and the media began to revise the country's militant past, and particularly the Easter Rising. The coalition government of 1973–77, in particular the Minister for Posts and Telegraphs, Conor Cruise O'Brien, began to promote the view that the violence of 1916 was essentially no different from the violence then taking place in the streets of Belfast and Derry. O'Brien and others asserted that the Rising was doomed to military defeat from the outset, and that it failed to account for the determination of Ulster Unionists to remain in the United Kingdom.

Irish republicans continue to venerate the Rising and its leaders with murals in republican areas of Belfast and other towns celebrating the actions of Pearse and his comrades, and annual parades in remembrance of the Rising. The Irish government, however, discontinued its annual parade in Dublin in the early 1970s, and in 1976 it took the unprecedented step of proscribing (under the Offences against the State Act) a 1916 commemoration ceremony at the GPO organised by Sinn Féin and the Republican Commemoration Committee. A Labour Party TD, David Thornley, embarrassed the government (of which Labour was a member) by appearing on the platform at the ceremony, along with Máire Comerford, who had fought in the Rising, and Fiona Plunkett, sister of Joseph Plunkett.

With the advent of a Provisional IRA ceasefire and the beginning of what became known as the Peace Process during the 1990s, the government's view of the Rising grew more positive and in 1996 an 80th anniversary commemoration at the Garden of Remembrance in Dublin was attended by the Taoiseach and leader of Fine Gael, John Bruton. In 2005, the Taoiseach, Bertie Ahern, announced the government's intention to resume the military parade past the GPO from Easter 2006, and to form a committee to plan centenary celebrations in 2016. The 90th anniversary was celebrated with a military parade in Dublin on Easter Sunday, 2006, attended by the President of Ireland, the Taoiseach and the Lord Mayor of Dublin. There is now an annual ceremony at Easter attended by relatives of those who fought, by the President, the Taoiseach, ministers, senators and TDs, and by usually large and respectful crowds.

The Rising continues to attract debate and analysis. In 2016 The Enemy Files, a documentary presented by a former British Secretary of State for Defence, Michael Portillo, was shown on RTÉ One and the BBC, ahead of the centenary. Portillo declared that the execution of the 16 leaders of the insurrection could be justified in its context – a military response, against the background of the appalling European war – but that the rebels had set a trap that the British fell into and that every possible response by the British would have been a mistake of some kind. He commented on the role of Patrick Pearse, the martyrdom controversy and the Proclamation's reference to "our gallant [German] allies in Europe".

In December 2014 Dublin City Council approved a proposal to create a historical path commemorating the Rising, similar to the Freedom Trail in Boston. Lord Mayor of Dublin Christy Burke announced that the council had committed to building the trail, marking it with a green line or bricks, with brass plates marking the related historic sites such as the Rotunda and the General Post Office.

A pedestrian staircase that runs along 53rd Avenue, from 65th Place to 64th Street in west Queens, New York City was named 'Easter Rising Way' in 2016. Sinn Féin leader Gerry Adams spoke at the naming ceremony.

Date of commemoration 
The Easter Rising lasted from Easter Monday 24 April 1916 to Easter Saturday 29 April 1916. Annual commemorations, rather than taking place on 24–29 April, are typically based on the date of Easter, which is a moveable feast. For example, the annual military parade is on Easter Sunday; the date of coming into force of the Republic of Ireland Act 1948 was symbolically chosen as Easter Monday (18 April) 1949. The official programme of centenary events in 2016 climaxed from 25 March (Good Friday) to 2 April (Easter Saturday) with other events earlier and later in the year taking place on the calendrical anniversaries.

In popular culture 

 "Easter, 1916", a poem by the poet and playwright W.B. Yeats, published in 1921.
 "The Foggy Dew" is a song by Canon Charles O'Neill, composed during the Irish War of Independence, that eulogises the rebels of the Easter Rising.
 The Plough and the Stars is a 1926 play by Seán O'Casey that takes place during the Easter Rising.
 Insurrection is a 1950 novel by Liam O'Flaherty that takes place during the Rising.
 The Red and the Green is a 1965 novel by Iris Murdoch that covers the events leading up to and during the Easter Rising.
 Insurrection is an eight-part 1966 docudrama made by Telefís Éireann for the 50th anniversary of the Rising. It was rebroadcast during the centenary celebrations in 2016.
 "Grace" is a 1985 song about the marriage of Joseph Plunkett to Grace Gifford in Kilmainham Gaol before his execution.
 1916, A Novel of the Irish Rebellion is a 1998 historical novel by Morgan Llywelyn.
 A Star Called Henry is a 1999 novel by Roddy Doyle that partly recounts the Easter Rising through the involvement of the novel's protagonist Henry Smart.
 At Swim, Two Boys is a 2001 novel by Irish writer Jamie O'Neill, set in Dublin before and during the 1916 Easter Rising.
 Rebel Heart, is a 2001 BBC miniseries on the life of a (fictional) nationalist from the Rising through the Irish Civil War.
 Blood Upon the Rose is a 2009 graphic novel by Gerry Hunt depicting the events of the Easter Rising.
 1916 Seachtar na Cásca is a 2010 Irish TV documentary series based on the Easter Rising, telling about seven signatories of the rebellion.
 The Dream of the Celt is a 2012 novel by Mario Vargas Llosa based on the life and death of Roger Casement, including his involvement with the Rising.
 Rebellion is a 2016 mini-series about the Easter Rising.
 1916 is a 2016 three part documentary mini-series about the Easter Rising narrated by Liam Neeson.
Penance is a 2018 Irish film set primarily in Donegal in 1916 and in Derry in 1969, in which the Rising is also featured.

See also 

 List of Irish uprisings

Notes

References 

 Augusteijn, Joost (ed.)The Memoirs of John M. Regan, a Catholic Officer in the RIC and RUC, 1909–48, Witnessed Rising, .
 
 Caulfield, Max, The Easter Rebellion, Dublin 1916 
 
 Coogan, Tim Pat, 1916: The Easter Rising (2001) 
 Coogan, Tim Pat, The IRA (2nd ed. 2000), 
 De Rosa, Peter. Rebels: The Irish Rising of 1916. Fawcett Columbine, New York. 1990. 
 Eberspächer, Cord/Wiechmann, Gerhard: "Erfolg Revolution kann Krieg entscheiden". Der Einsatz von S.M.H. LIBAU im irischen Osteraufstand 1916 ("Successful revolution may decide war". The use of S.M.H. LIBAU in the Irish Easter rising 1916), in: Schiff & Zeit, Nr. 67, Frühjahr 2008, S. 2–16.
 
 Feeney, Brian, Sinn Féin: A Hundred Turbulent Years, O'Brien Press, 2002, 
 Foster, R. F. Vivid Faces: The Revolutionary Generation in Ireland, 1890–1923 (2015) excerpt 
 Foy, Michael and Barton, Brian, The Easter Rising 
 Greaves, C. Desmond, The Life and Times of James Connolly
 Hennessey, Thomas, Dividing Ireland, World War I and Partition, The passing of the Home Rule Bill (Routledge Press, 1998) 
 Jackson, Alvin, Home Rule, an Irish History 1800–2000 (Phoenix Press, 2003), 
 
 Kee, Robert, The Green Flag 
 
 Kostick, Conor & Collins, Lorcan, The Easter Rising, A Guide to Dublin in 1916 
 Lyons, F.S.L., Ireland Since the Famine 
 Martin, F.X. (ed.), Leaders and Men of the Easter Rising, Dublin 1916 Macardle, Dorothy, The Irish Republic (Dublin 1951)
 MacDonagh, Oliver, Ireland: The Union and its aftermath, George Allen & Unwin, 1977, 
 McKeown, Eitne, 'A Family in the Rising' Dublin Electricity Supply Board Journal 1966.
 McNally, Michael and Dennis, Peter, Easter Rising 1916: Birth of the Irish Republic (London 2007), Osprey Publishing, 
 Moran, Seán Farrell, Patrick Pearse and the Politics of Redemption, 1994, Catholic University of America Press, 

 "Patrick Pearse and Patriotic Soteriology," in Yonah Alexander and Alan O'Day, eds, The Irish Terrorism Experience, (Aldershot: Dartmouth) 1991
 Murphy, John A., Ireland in the Twentieth Century Ó Broin, Leon, Dublin Castle & the 1916 Rising, Sidgwick & Jackson, 1970
 O'Farrell, Elizabeth, 'Events of Easter Week' The Catholic Bulletin (Dublin 1917).
 Purdon, Edward, The 1916 Rising 
 
 Ryan, Annie, Witnesses: Inside the Easter Rising Shaw, Francis, S.J., "The Canon of Irish History: A Challenge", in Studies: An Irish Quarterly Review, LXI, 242, 1972, pp. 113–52
 Stephens, James, The Insurrection in Dublin Townshend, Charles, Easter 1916: The Irish Rebellion (London 2006)

 Historiography 
 Bunbury, Turtle. Easter Dawn – The 1916 Rising (Mercier Press, 2015) 
 McCarthy, Mark. Ireland's 1916 Rising: Explorations of History-Making, Commemoration & Heritage in Modern Times (2013), historiography excerpt
 Neeson, Eoin, Myths from Easter 1916, Aubane Historical Society (Cork, 2007), 

 External links 

 Easter 1916 – Digital Heritage Website
 The 1916 Rising – an Online Exhibition. National Library of Ireland
 The Letters of 1916 – Crowdsourcing Project Trinity College Dublin
 
 
 Lillian Stokes (1878–1955): account of the 1916 Easter Rising
 Primary and secondary sources relating to the Easter Rising (Sources database, National Library of Ireland)
 Easter Rising site and walking tour of 1916 Dublin
 News articles and letters to the editor in The Age, 27 April 1916
 The 1916 Rising by Norman Teeling  a 10-painting suite acquired by An Post for permanent display at the General Post Office (Dublin)
 The Easter Rising—BBC History''
 The Irish Story archive on the Rising
 Easter Rising website
 The Discussion On Self-Determination Summed Up Lenin's discussion of the importance of the rebellion appears in Section 10: The Irish Rebellion of 1916
 Bureau of Military History – Witness Statements Online (PDF files)

 
1916 in Ireland
20th-century rebellions
Anti-imperialism in Europe
April 1916 events
Conflicts in 1916
Attacks in Ireland
History of County Dublin
History of Ireland (1801–1923)
Ireland–United Kingdom relations
Rebellions in Ireland
Wars involving the United Kingdom